Pulmonate may refer to
 Having lungs; in particular
 Pulmonata, gastropods which breathe through pallial lungs 
 Pulmonate arthropods, which breathe through book lungs